Woodlands is a planning area and residential town located in the North of Singapore. As of 2019, the town has a population of 254,733. It is the densest planning area and is the regional centre for the North Region of the country. 

The Woodlands planning area borders Sembawang to the east, Mandai to the south and Sungei Kadut to the west. Woodlands New Town, which was developed during the 1980s, is situated within the Woodlands planning area.

Woodlands also serves as one of the two land border connections on the Singaporean side between the countries of Singapore and Malaysia, called the Johor–Singapore Causeway, the other being the Tuas Second Link at Tuas.

History

British administration
The area consisting of modern-day Woodlands Town first witnessed the opening of the Johor-Singapore Causeway in 1923. Early Woodlands consisted of villages where residents made their living mostly as small-time shopkeepers and vegetable farmers in the Marsiling area, while rubber plantations and poultry farms dot the landscape at where modern-day Admiralty is located.

Post-independence

The first HDB flats were built from 1972 in the northern part of Marsiling, and the Woodlands Bus Interchange located at Woodlands Centre Road was built in 1980.

Prior to 1988, Woodlands was divided into Bukit Panjang SMC and Sembawang SMC, before it was merged in 1991 into Sembawang GRC in the sense of growing development.

The development of Woodlands began in 1981. This comprises the building of HDB flats in the Neighbourhood 1, which was completed in 1985; well after the Marsiling Estate. The Neighbourhood 8 was completed in 1987, together with the Neighbourhood 3 in 1989. Because of the saturation of HDB flats, the numbering system added 'A', 'B' and 'C'. Blocks 6xx in Admiralty begun to be completed in 1996, together with the 7xx in 1997. Expansion into Innova began in 1998 and was completed in 2002, which consists of block 5xx. Expansion into the Woodlands East began in 1999 and completed in 2004.

The Jalan Ulu Sembawang is a rural road that cut across parts of the Woodlands New Town and the Sembawang Airbase. Starting from June 1992, the Jalan Ulu Sembawang is being cleared because of the extension of Woodlands New Town, Gambas Avenue, Sembawang Airbase and the Seletar Expressway. The village was cleared by 1996 and it was being converted into a military training ground.

Neighbourhood layout
There are three constituencies in the town, and nine neighbourhoods (N1 to N9) within the Woodlands vicinity made up primarily of Woodlands, Marsiling, Woodgrove and Admiralty. Woodlands Square serves as the town centre while adjacent neighbourhood centres also offer a variety of commercial activities. Integrated development plans including Kampung Admiralty (Admiralty Village) were officially launched in April 2014.

Of all the estates, Woodgrove is the smallest in size, located towards the southwest end of the town. Woodgrove houses most of the private housing in Woodlands, consisting of high-rise condominiums, and landed properties. Woodgrove lies in between the estates of Marsiling and Woodlands.

Marsiling, Woodlands, Woodgrove and Admiralty all together form Woodlands New Town.

Facilities

Woodlands is diverse during the day and well lit at night. Shops, eateries, and commercial zones are evenly spread through the town, with bus and transit routes operating till close to midnight.

Divisions within estates are being rapidly modernised and modelled for Singapore's standards; playgrounds, communal gardens, sheltered pavements, multi-level parking lots, barbecue-pits, recreational facilities (such as tennis courts) and trees are found nearly everywhere.

Parks
With the modernising process outpacing the preservation of its past, Marsiling Park (formerly Woodlands Town Garden) keeps a clear and simple agenda, to bring greenery in the right ambience with the mixture of the local ethnicities. The theme of the park revolves around the Malay and Chinese culture, and winding through the park is Sungei Mandai Kechil, the river that extends into a lake within the park. Marsiling Park is located near to the Woodlands Checkpoint, in the Marsiling estate.

To the east of this area, bordering the polytechnic is Admiralty Park, a 27-hectare national park much of which is covered in mangrove. The most recent riverine park which opened in phases is the Woodlands Waterfront Park. It has engaged a lot of residents, especially those staying in northern Singapore. It is also linked to Admiralty Park and a 25 km Northern Explorer Park Connector Network.

Mandai Tekong Park, located at Woodlands Avenue 5, is a lawned park among residential areas consisting of a fenced off court for ball games & benches with a running track.

Vista Park is located at Woodlands Drive 16 among residential areas. It is a park situated at a walking distance to Vista Point and consists of playgrounds and running tracks for recreational purposes.

Malls
Causeway Point, one of the largest shopping malls in Singapore, houses 250 shops and various outlets, including a cinema and two food courts. There used to be a John Little department store within the mall but it closed in 2010.

Woodlands Regional Library, the largest neighbourhood library in Singapore at the time of its launch, is operated by the National Library Board. The four-storey public library within the Woodlands Civic Centre caters to all ages and is organised according to themes of general, reference, teens, and children.

Woodlands Civic Centre is a designated centre of education, public services, and other forms of assistance for residents. The centre houses the Woodlands Regional Library, several banks, CPF Woodlands Branch, numerous merchandise and educational institutions, and restaurants.

Woods Square is a mixed use integrated commercial development with retail, F&B, and a childcare centre.

Recreation
Sports are an emerging emphasis in the Singaporean society. Recreational facilities can be easily located around the estates and especially in parks: The Woodlands Stadium and Woodlands Swimming Complex are common places for sport-goers.

Experimental styles of architecture have found their way into Woodlands, making the town a place of wonder and colour, with much integration with recreation. From the early practical designs to its modern-day luxurious manifestation, housing apartment blocks are no longer as plain as they sound; with the garnish of parks, communal gardens and décors, these blocks are pieces of art and style themselves. The centrepiece of the town, Woodlands Square, attracts a constant flow of travellers and shoppers daily. Tireless planning and redevelopment keeps the town modernised.

Education
, this area has a total of 12 primary schools, 10 secondary schools and a polytechnic, namely Republic Polytechnic. Educational institutions are evenly distributed throughout the estate. From newly founded schools to well-established ones, Woodlands has several top educational institutions in the northern region. Innova Junior College merged with Yishun Junior College in 2019.

The list of schools in Woodlands is as follows:

Primary schools 

 Admiralty Primary School
 Evergreen Primary School
 Fuchun Primary School
 Greenwood Primary School
 Innova Primary School
 Marsiling Primary School
 Qihua Primary School
 Riverside Primary School
 Si Ling Primary School
 Woodgrove Primary School
 Woodlands Primary School
 Woodlands Ring Primary School

Secondary schools 

 Admiralty Secondary School
 Christ Church Secondary School
 Evergreen Secondary School
 Fuchun Secondary School
 Marsiling Secondary School
 Riverside Secondary School
 Woodgrove Secondary School
 Woodlands Secondary School
 Woodlands Ring Secondary School

Si Ling Secondary School was closed and merged with Marsiling Secondary School with effect from 2017.

Polytechnics 

 Republic Polytechnic

Specialised schools 

 Singapore Sports School (independent school for sports-inclined students)  
 Spectra Secondary School (for Normal (Technical) students)

International schools 

 Singapore American School

Places of worship
Woodlands has 6 churches, 2 mosques and 12 temples.

Churches
 Church of Saint Anthony
 Covenant Evangelical Free Church
 Lighthouse Evangelism
 New Life Bible Presbyterian Church
 Woodlands Evangelical Free Church
 Light of Christ Church Woodlands

Mosques
 An-Nur Mosque
 Yusof Ishak Mosque

Temples
 Shang Di Miao Chai Kong Temple (上帝廟濟公壇), Marsiling Ind Estate Road 3
Hong Tho Bilw Temple (鳳圖廟), Marsiling Ind Estate Road 3
Ching Chwee Temple (清水廟東聖殿), Woodlands Industrial Park E8
Wu Dang Shan Temple (武當山), Woodlands Industrial Park E8
Tien Chor Temple (天祖廟), Woodlands Industrial Park E8
Jin Fu Gong Gong De Tang (金福宮功德堂), Woodlands Industrial Park E8
Hong Sun Tan Temple (德惠鳳山壇), Woodlands Industrial Park E4
Fei Loong Gong Temple (飛龍宮), Woodlands Industrial Park E4
Mandai Lian Hup Tng Temple (萬禮蓮合殿), Woodlands Industrial Park E4
Siang San Temple (玄山庙救世壇), Woodlands Industrial Park E4
 BW Monastery (吉祥寶聚寺), Woodlands Drive 16
 Siva Krishnan Temple, Marsiling Rise

Accessibility

Road
Being located immediately across from Johor Bahru, Woodlands is highly accessible, connected by major roads and expressways. The Causeway connects to the Bukit Timah Expressway (BKE) at Woodlands Checkpoint to allow easy access to Woodlands and other parts of Singapore.

Land transportation in Woodlands is relatively efficient, contrasting by the amount of well-maintained roads, though a common sight in Singapore. Twelve avenues support and help circulate all of the traffic of the town, especially the notable ones, such as Avenue 2, Avenue 3 and Avenue 7, which come from the expressways.

Woodlands Avenue 2 is a shorter route from the town centre and older estates to the Seletar Expressway. To connect the Woodlands Avenue 2 into the Seletar Expressway, part of the road was being built since 1998.

Woodlands Avenue 3 connects Marsiling from the exit of BKE to Woodlands Centre Road, which leads to Woodlands Checkpoint. The rest of it maintains a similar route of the MRT line, which connects to Woodlands Square.

As the avenue ends at the entrance of the slope of Woodlands Square (the road that circulates Woodlands Square), another end starts at Woodlands Avenue 7, which connects Woodlands to Admiralty, also along the route of the MRT line, ending at Gambas Avenue.

Divisions within estates are further connected and regulated by two- or single lane roads called streets, which are distinguished by a suffix of double-digit numbers, such as Woodlands Street 82 and Woodlands Street 83. This was a common practice before the late '90s. Drives are two- or single lane roads built for newer divisions within an estate, similar to that of the streets.

Links and Crescents are often three-, two-, or single-lane roads that convey commuters from the main road to another main road, such as the Woodlands Link, which connects Woodlands Avenue 9 to the main roads in the Woodlands Industrial Park. Crescents connect main roads to streets or drives.

Rail
Residents of Woodlands are currently serviced by five Mass Rapid Transit (MRT) stations across two MRT lines intersecting each other, the North-South Line and Thomson-East Coast Line:

 Woodlands MRT station at the town centre (both lines)
 Woodlands North MRT station in the north (Thomson-East Coast Line)
 Woodlands South MRT station in the south (Thomson-East Coast Line)
 Marsiling MRT station in the west (North-South Line)
 Admiralty MRT station in the east (North-South Line)

The travelling time from Woodlands MRT station to City Hall MRT station in the central business district is approximately 40 minutes.

Woodlands Train Checkpoint is linked by a shuttle train to Johor Bahru Sentral station in Malaysia across the causeway. It is planned to be replaced by a rapid transit link, the Johor Bahru–Singapore Rapid Transit System, will have its Singapore terminus at Woodlands North MRT station, improving access between Johor Bahru and Singapore.

Bus 
Under the government's plans to develop a new town centre in the geographical centre of Woodlands, the town's bus interchange was relocated from the previous Woodlands Town Centre to the current town centre at Woodlands Square in 1996. This bus interchange, the Woodlands Regional Bus Interchange, was the first underground bus interchange in Singapore, having been built under the Woodlands MRT station. It was built this way to maximise space.

In 2016, Woodlands Temporary Bus Interchange was opened to facilitate renovation work at the former bus interchange, which included connecting it to the Thomson-East Coast Line. All bus services relocated to the temporary interchange. The former bus interchange, which is now known as the Woodlands Integrated Transport Hub, had reopened on 13 June 2021 as the 11th integrated transport hub in Singapore.

Politics
Woodlands was under jurisdiction for two constituencies in the northern area as of the 2020 elections, namely Sembawang GRC and Marsiling-Yew Tee GRC, both of which were controlled by the ruling People's Action Party. In early days, Woodlands was mostly covered under a single constituency of Sembawang (and in 1988, as a GRC) and parts of Bukit Panjang SMC prior to the 1991 elections. Woodlands and Sembawang has since expanded into divisions for Marsiling and Woodlands in 2001, followed by Admiralty in 2006, and Woodgrove in 2011. In 2015, both Marsiling and Woodgrove were later hived out from Sembawang GRC into the new Marsiling-Yew Tee GRC due to the population growth from the neighbouring Yew Tee from the Chua Chu Kang GRC.

Future plans
According to the Urban Redevelopment Authority and its Master Plan for the North Region, the Woodlands Regional Centre is set to become the "Northern Gateway" of Singapore. Featuring some 700,000m² of new commercial space and more than 100 hectares of land that will be developed, the growth of the Woodlands Regional Centre will anchor the development of the North Coast Innovation Corridor. More commercial and shopping options will progressively be made available in the Woodlands Central, with a future pedestrian mall running through the heart of the district. As a significant employment cluster, the Woodlands North Coast will bring jobs and commercial opportunities closer to home for residents of the North Region. A new waterfront park will be built to connect the two districts of Woodlands Central and Woodlands North Coast. More park connectors and cycling paths will be built to connect to the 150 km Round Island Route and Rail Corridor.

See also

 Woodlands Train Checkpoint
 Places in Singapore

References

External links

 North West Community Development Council
 Sembawang Town Council
 Woodlands Town Park
 Republic Polytechnic
 Singapore Sports School
 Singapore American School
 HDB Team Woodlands

 
Places in Singapore
New towns in Singapore
North Region, Singapore
Malaysia–Singapore border crossings
New towns started in the 1980s